Antidesma platyphyllum is a species of flowering tree in the leafflower family, Phyllanthaceae, that is endemic to Hawaii. Common names include hame, haā, mehame, hamehame, mēhamehame, and haāmaile.

References

External links

platyphyllum
Plants described in 1867
Endemic flora of Hawaii
Trees of Hawaii